John Howard Mulroy (February 10, 1925 – September 6, 1999) was an American politician most notable for having served as the first county executive of Onondaga County, New York.

Mulroy was born to Morris, a dairy farmer, and Elizabeth, a former schoolteacher. His father served as the Marcellus supervisor on the Onondaga County Board of Supervisors from 1937 to 1953, when the senior Mulroy died in office.

Mulroy served as a bomber pilot in the United States Air Force for three years during World War II, and was married September 15, 1945 to the former Virginia Spaulding.  He graduated with a degree in history from the University College of Syracuse University and initially earned a living by delivering milk from his family's dairy.

He began his political career by getting elected to his father's old position on the County Board of Supervisors, starting in 1957 and rising to chairman of the board in 1961.  In the 1961 election, Onondaga County voters approved the adoption of a new county charter which provided for the creation of the office of county executive.  The board of supervisors appointed then-chairman Mulroy as the first county executive to serve a one-year term before the office was to become elective.  In 1962, the electorate voted Mulroy into his first elected term in office, which lasted five years.

His achievements in office include:
Building the $26 million Onondaga County Civic Center
A $12.8 million renovation of the Burnet Park Zoo
Construction of the Onondaga County Correctional Facility
Creation of the Beaver Lake Nature Center
Undertaking of the $45 million Lake Ontario Water Project
Building the 526-bed Van Duyn Home and Hospital
Building the $127 million metropolitan sewage treatment plant
Building Onondaga Community College
Creating a county-wide health department
Modernizing MacArthur Stadium
Developing Oneida Shores Park

Mulroy was investigated several times for corruption between 1977 and 1982.
He was ultimately convicted of misdemeanors and fined.

Mulroy announced his intention to retire in 1987.  In his retirement, he served on the boards of several not-for-profit organizations, notably the Onondaga Historical Association, to which he donated a quarter of a million dollars.

Mulroy was stricken while on a Syracuse Newspapers-sponsored fishing trip in the Thousand Islands and was taken to Kingston General Hospital.  He died after two days.  He is buried in St. Francis Xavier Cemetery in the Town of Marcellus.

The Onondaga County Civic Center is named in his honor.

His son, former judge J. Kevin Mulroy, was removed from the bench in August 2000 for judicial misconduct.  He died from a mysterious, rapidly progressing illness in 2005 and is buried alongside his parents.  One of his daughters, Martha E. Mulroy, currently serves as a Family Court Judge.

References

1925 births
1999 deaths
Onondaga County Executives
New York (state) Republicans
Politicians from Syracuse, New York
Syracuse University alumni
United States Air Force officers
20th-century American politicians